Eberhard I may refer to:

 Eberhard I of Friuli (c. 815–867)
 Eberhard I, Count of Bonngau (fl. 904–937)
 Eberhard I, Count of Berg-Altena (1140–1180)
 Eberhard I (archbishop of Salzburg) (fl. 1147–1164)
 Eberhard I, Count of the Mark (c. 1255–1308)
 Eberhard I, Count of Württemberg (1265–1325)
 Eberhard I, Duke of Württemberg (1445–1496)

See also
 Eberhard